Guangwu was the posthumous name of Liu Xiu (5 BCE–47), first emperor of the Eastern Han dynasty in China.

Guangwu may also refer to:

People 
 Duke Guangwu of Qin (秦廣武公; 846–898), formal title of Wang Chao, Chinese warlord in the Tang Dynasty
 Lord of Guangwu (廣武君), Li Zuoju, advisor to Chen Yu before the Battle of Jingxing
 Marquis of Guangwu (廣武侯), title given to Jin Dynasty official Zhang Hua (232–300) 
 Prince of Guangwu (廣武王), also known as Li Chenghong, imperial prince of the Chinese Tang Dynasty

Places 
 Guangwu County (廣武縣), an earlier name of Dai County, Shanxi, China
 Guangwu Expressway (廣梧高速公路), a highway in China in Guangdong and Guangxi
 Guangwu Great Wall (广武长城), a section of the Great Wall of China in Shanyin County, Shanxi

 Guangwu railway station, a station along the Chinese Zhengzhou–Jiaozuo intercity railway
 Guangwu Subdistrict (光武街道), a subdistrict of Xiangcheng City in Zhoukou, Henan Province, China
 Guangwu Subdistrict, Nanyang, Henan (光武街道), a subdistrict of the Wolong District of Nanyang, Henan Province, China
 Guangwu, Xingyang (广武镇), a town in the Xingyang District of Zhengzhou, Henan Province, China
 Guangwu, an administrative division of Jiaoxi Township, Yilan County, Taiwan
 Guāngwǔ Town (光武镇), a town in Jieshou, Anhui Province, China
 Mount Guangwu (光雾山), type locality for the frog Odorrana kuangwuensis in Nanjiang County, Sechuan Province, China